Arab-e Gavmishi (also Romanized as ‘Arab-e Gāvmīshī and ‘Arab Gāvmīshī; also known as Arab-e Gaymīshī) is a village in Famur Rural District, Jereh and Baladeh District, Kazerun County, Fars Province, Iran. At the 2006 census, its population was 1,292, in 293 families.

References 

Populated places in Kazerun County